Fusantrum is a genus of worms belonging to the family Solenofilomorphidae.

Species:
 Fusantrum rhammiphorum Crezee, 1975

References

Acoelomorphs